Goody is an unincorporated community in Pike County, Kentucky, United States. Its post office closed in August 1996. Goody is now a part of Belfry.

The origin of the name "Goody" is obscure.

References

Unincorporated communities in Pike County, Kentucky
Unincorporated communities in Kentucky